Daniel Armstrong may refer to:
Daniel Armstrong (film director) (born 1971), Australian film director
Daniel W. Armstrong (born 1949), American analytical chemist
Daniel Armstrong (footballer) (born 1997), Scottish footballer for Kilmarnock

See also
Dan Armstrong, American guitarist, luthier, and session musician